A police tactical unit is a highly trained police unit that tactically manages and resolves high-risk incidents, including terrorist incidents.

Police Tactical Unit may also refer to:
 Police Tactical Unit (Hong Kong)
 Police Tactical Unit (Singapore)
 PTU: Police Tactical Unit, a 2003 Hong Kong crime thriller film

See also
 List of police tactical units